The Scholar Ship was a recognized academic program aboard a modified Royal Caribbean Cruises passenger ship hosting both undergraduate and postgraduate students on semester-long voyages around the world. Participants from diverse cultural backgrounds came together to create a transnational learning community designed to develop their intercultural competence. The discontinuation of the program was announced in June 2008.

Programs aboard the Scholar Ship were 16 weeks in duration. One was run in 2007 and another in 2008.

Approximately 200 students from 35 countries participated in the inaugural voyage which sailed on September 5, 2007. The second voyage embarked from Hong Kong on January 2, 2008 and ended in Amsterdam, Netherlands in April 2008.

Academic Steward Institutions

A consortium of universities contributed to the Scholar Ship's programming and were responsible for overseeing the quality of its academic offerings. Students received academic credit from Macquarie University (Australia) and hands-on experience through participation in four Port Program elements:
Academic Field Programs; Community Service; Shore Excursions; and Independent Travel. The Scholar Ship's transnational learning community integrated academic, cultural, and social experiences into programs that were designed to enhance students' personal and professional development.

 Al Akhawayn University (Morocco)
 Cardiff University (United Kingdom)
 Fudan University (China)
 Macquarie University (Australia)
 Monterrey Institute of Technology and Higher Education  (Mexico)
 University of California, Berkeley (USA)
 University of Ghana (Ghana)

Academic programs
The Academic Steward institutions designed the TSS academic program based on five "Learning Circles" (interdisciplinary subjects) for undergraduates and three for postgraduate students. The courses offered were directly from the college catalogs of the Academic Steward institutions.

The undergraduate studies program of the Scholar Ship consisted of two core subjects (Global Issues and Intercultural Communication) taken by all students, and an array of subjects offered within the Scholar Ship's five undergraduate Learning Circles: 
International Business and Communication
Sustainable Development
Conflict Studies
Global Cultures and Social Change
Worlds of Art and Culture
Students could also select one subject from a group of General Studies offerings.

Postgraduate students had a variety of options to either earn postgraduate certificates or continue their studies onshore to earn postgraduate degrees. Postgraduate degrees were awarded by one or more of a group of institutions around the world that accepted credit for postgraduate study aboard the Scholar Ship.

Postgraduate students selected a Learning Circle in which they pursued their studies throughout the semester. Specific subjects offered in each Learning Circle were drawn from the curricula of Academic Steward institutions and included offerings in:
International Business
International Communication
International Relations
Students had to choose at least one of their elective subjects from within their own postgraduate Learning Circle and two additional subjects from those offered in any Learning Circle.

Port Program
The Scholar Ship's Port Program provided students with experiential learning opportunities in host countries around the world and were designed to add relevancy and global perspective to the onboard academic programs. The Port Program presented opportunities for students to explore the host countries' diverse cultures through four elements:
 Academic Field Programs
Community Service
 Shore Excursions
 Independent Travel

Each of the four elements of the Port Program were developed in collaboration with local academic and professional partners, drawing on a variety of experiential education methodologies. As a result, students learned from local experts and successful practitioners who shared their knowledge, opinions and insights into each region's culture. There was also time for personal exploration, leisure and recreation.

Onboard residential life

The Scholar Ship's academic and residential life programs were designed to develop intercultural leadership skills.

On board, students were immersed in a multicultural living environment. The goal was for the international student body, faculty and staff to form a learning community. This transnational learning community integrated academic, cultural, and social experiences into the program in a way that sought to enhance personal and professional development.

Every student belonged to a small residential community group. Residential communities congregated throughout the voyage for discussions and community-building activities that were intended to support the Scholar Ship's learning outcomes and social aspects of the program.

The ship

The Scholar Ship vessel was the MV Oceanic II. She is a 29,000 ton, 201 meter ocean liner with 398 staterooms that could accommodate 796 students, faculty and staff. The ship could also accommodate 416 crew members.

September 2007
In September 2007, the Scholar Ship set sail on its 16-week inaugural voyage from Greece to Hong Kong. The itinerary of port stops spanned 4 continents and was developed to provide global perspectives on topics explored through onboard academic programs.

Greece to Portugal:
Embarking from Athens, Greece, the ship made its way through the Mediterranean Sea to arrive at its first port of call: Lisbon, Portugal. Students and staff explored Lisbon via Academic Field Programs that included visits to the University of Lisbon, various museums and businesses.

Panama:
Panama City, Panama was the next port stop for the ship.  Students spent time learning about local tribal culture, economic and industrial growth. Through lectures and discussions with the Panama Canal Authority, students also delved into the commercial history of the region.

Ecuador & The Galapagos:
After navigating the Panama Canal, the Scholar Ship continued on to port in Guayaquil, Ecuador. After passing over the equator and into the southern hemisphere, many onboard took the opportunity to spend time in the Galapagos Islands. The ship then continued traveling southwest to Papeete, Tahiti.

Tahiti & New Zealand:
After a brief port stop in Tahiti, the Scholar Ship embarked for Auckland, New Zealand, where students made connections with local businesses and examined the culture of  indigenous New Zealanders, the Maori, through their Academic Field Programs. During independent travel time, students visited Rotorua for zorbing and went blackwater rafting in the caves of Waitomo.

Australia:
The next port of call was Sydney, Australia. Academic Field Programs took the Scholar Ship students to local businesses and interactions with aboriginal tribes of Australia. Students also traveled independently to Perth, the Great Barrier Reef, and Melbourne.

China:
Departing Sydney, the ship made way for its last continental stop, Asia. The ship docked in Shanghai, on the banks of the historic Yangtze River. Academic Field Programs in Shanghai offered insight into the Chinese approach to business, international relations, and other fields. Also, an excursion in freezing temperatures had students slipping and sliding along the Great Wall. After Shanghai, the Scholar Ship headed south for Hong Kong, the final port on the September 2007 voyage itinerary.

January 2008
On January 2, 2008, the Scholar Ship's 16-week second voyage around the world began in the city of Hong Kong.

Shanghai, China: The Scholar Ship first headed north to the port of Shanghai, China. Fog delayed the ship's entry two days. In the five days that remained, Academic Field Programs took students to  locations that included the campus of Fudan University (an academic steward institution of the Scholar Ship), Shanghai Museum, the site of the first Communist Congress and Mao Zedong's former residence, and local businesses such as Coca-Cola and China Eastern Airlines.

Bangkok, Thailand: The Scholar Ship left Shanghai and made way into the South China Sea, docking in Bangkok, Thailand on January 23. Academic Field Programs brought students to Chulalongkorn University in Bangkok, the Grand Palace and Reclining Buddha Temple, and Chiang Rai, where they visited Baan Had Bay, a Tai Lue Ethnic Village on the Mekong River.

Chennai, India: Continuing south, sailing the Straits of Singapore and the Bay of Bengal, the Scholar Ship called on the port of  Chennai, India. It arrived at the city, formerly known as Madras, on February 5. Academic Field Programs in India took students from the Scholar Ship to lectures at the University of Madras, local businesses in Bangalore, a school in Kanchipuram for children rescued from sweatshops, and to Firefly, a sustainable spiritual commune a few hours outside of Chennai.

Equator Crossing & Port Victoria, Seychelles: The Scholar Ship celebrated an equatorial crossing on February 16 and headed on to a brief, mid-voyage break in Port Victoria, Seychelles, one of the smallest capitals in the world.

Cape Town, South Africa: The Scholar Ship arrived in Cape Town February 27. Students explored South Africa's role in regional and international affairs and got an overview of the changes in the socio economic ‘make up’ of the area. Also, the Scholar Ship Research Institute and University of Cape Town hosted an international workshop entitled: “Confronting the HIV/AIDS Epidemic: Policy Responses in South Africa and India”, February 28–29. Many students also participated in a service project which was co-hosted with the Wynberg Rotaract club.

Cape Verde Islands & Barcelona Spain: The next scheduled port stop for the Scholar Ship is the Cape Verde Islands, part of Western Africa, for a brief break.  It is then on to Barcelona, Spain, March 21, where students will study Barcelona's waterfront restoration, company management and the economic environment in Spain, as well as Spanish history and art.

Istanbul, Turkey: Crossing the Mediterranean Sea, the Scholar Ship arrived in Istanbul, Turkey on April 1. Academic Field Programs were slated to highlight Turkish history and the economy.

Lisbon, Portugal: The Scholar Ship journeyed back across the Mediterranean to arrive in Lisbon, Portugal on April 15.  This was the last port stop of the semester with Academic Field Programs.

Amsterdam, Netherlands: The final port on the Scholar Ship's January 2008 voyage itinerary.

Alumni involvement
One of the most potentially valuable aspects of the Scholar Ship experience was considered to be the tight knit, international community created by some of the students, staff and faculty on board. Following the inaugural voyage in September 2007, the Scholar Ship established “The Bridge”, an alumni network designed to maintain this community by keeping past students, staff, and faculty connected through technology.

One component of the Bridge is a 24/7 chat room called the Cove. It is designated for exclusive use by shipmates of specific voyages. Alumni can also choose to join an online community called interculture. Interculture is a connecting point for alumni, current and prospective students, as well as staff, faculty and the balance of the Scholar Ship community.

The Scholar Ship offered alumni newsletters and updates, but the community itself has many outlets of self-expression. The September 2007 class published a photo book entitled Hononga that sought to capture the journey through images by staff and students alike. Blogging is a common way for some alumni, staff, faculty and current students of the Scholar Ship to tell their stories. They also utilize the Bridge as a media sharing portal for the group. FotoShare and the Scholar Ship Video Library allow posting, organizing, and sharing of pictures and videos. The Bridge also provides an official alumni directory with the capability to create and update personal profiles so alumni, staff and faculty can keep in contact.

Financial difficulties

On June 11, 2008, the Scholar Ship indefinitely canceled all future voyages due to difficulties in raising the necessary finances.  Efforts are underway to re-organize the program and raise the necessary funds to launch future voyages.

See also
 Semester at Sea

References

External links
 

Study abroad programs
Cardiff University
Macquarie University
Monterrey Institute of Technology and Higher Education
University of California, Berkeley
University of Ghana
2007 in education
2008 in education
Semester at sea programs